The 2005 season of Landsbankadeildin was the 94th season of league football in Iceland. FH defended their title. Fram and recently promoted Þróttur were relegated.

Final league position

Results
Each team played every opponent once home and away for a total of 18 matches.

Top goalscorers

References

Úrvalsdeild karla (football) seasons
1
Iceland
Iceland